Azimpur is an old region in the old part of Dhaka, capital of Bangladesh. The region is named after Shahzada Azam, son of Mughal Emperor Aurangzeb. Other accounts attribute the name to Azim-us-Shaan, the Nayeb-e-Nazim of Dhaka during the early 18th century. This area started to decay in the colonial era. In 1850 Azimpur shown as a no man's land in the map of surveyor general. In 1950 this area redesigned as the government employee's residence.

Geography
Its total area is 1.17 km.

Demographics
As of the 1991 Bangladesh census, Azimpur has a population of 96,641; male 51,598, female 45.043.

After the 1947 partition, many apartment buildings were built in Azimpur for government officers. The region has one of the largest cemeteries of Dhaka. It has more than 3900 permanent graves, and many temporary graves (which are reused after several years).

Administration
Azimpur has 01 Ward (Ward 26), 20 Mahallas and 01 Police Outpost Station.

Education
Eden College, one of the oldest educational institutions for girls in erstwhile British India, is located in Azimpur. Renowned girls' schools such as Agrani School and College and a branch of Viqarunnisa Noon School and College are also located there.
College of Home economics is another well being institute. Nearby institutions include Dhaka University and Bangladesh University of Engineering and Technology.

See also
 Upazilas of Bangladesh
 Districts of Bangladesh
 Divisions of Bangladesh

References

External links 
 Azimpur Area Map

Neighbourhoods in Dhaka
Populated places in Dhaka Division